Chris Hibbert (born 29 April 1976) is a South African former field hockey player who competed in the 2004 Summer Olympics and the 2008 Summer Olympics.

He also competed in the 2002 and 2006 Hockey World Cups, and the 2002 and 2006 Commonwealth Games.
He was the South African Hockey Men's Player of the Year in 2006. He retired from international hockey in 2008 with 118 test caps.

Honours
1999 All African Games - Gold
2000 African Cup - Gold
2001 Champions Challenge - Silver
2003 Champions Challenge - Bronze
2003 All African Games - Silver
2005 African Cup - Gold
2007 African Cup - Gold

References

External links

1976 births
Living people
South African male field hockey players
Olympic field hockey players of South Africa
Field hockey players at the 2004 Summer Olympics
Field hockey players at the 2008 Summer Olympics
Field hockey players at the 2002 Commonwealth Games
Field hockey players at the 2006 Commonwealth Games
Commonwealth Games competitors for South Africa
2006 Men's Hockey World Cup players
20th-century South African people
21st-century South African people